Tricellina is a genus of spiders in the family Anapidae. It was first described in 1989 by Forster & Platnick. , it contains only one species, Tricellina gertschi, found in Chile.

References

Anapidae
Monotypic Araneomorphae genera
Spiders of South America
Endemic fauna of Chile